Tokelau, a dependent territory of New Zealand, adopted an official flag in 2009. Previously, the flag of New Zealand was used as the official flag for Tokelau. 

In May 2008, the local parliament, the General Fono, approved a distinctive flag and national emblem for Tokelau. The Governor-General presented the flag to the Ulu-o-Tokelau as Tokelau's first official flag on 7 September 2009.

A referendum on self-determination in 2006 failed to carry (it was supported, but not with the necessary supermajority), and another one in October 2007 fell 16 votes short.

History

1989 proposal
An alternative and unofficial flag has been reported. The three stars in this flag represent the three atolls which make up the islands of Tokelau.

2007 proposal
In June 2007 the regional parliament (General Fono) decided over the future flag, anthem and national symbol of Tokelau. The proposed flag depicted a stylized Polynesian canoe and four stars. The stars represent the three main islands and also Swains Island, administered by the United States (American Samoa) but claimed by Tokelau. As the required supermajority was not reached in the 2007 self-determination referendum, the flag was not officially adopted.

2008 final proposal
In May 2008, the General Fono approved the final versions of the national symbols of Tokelau. The flag design approved is based on the 2007 proposal with minor changes to the arrangement of the stars, the Southern Cross is used in place of a representation of the geographic location of the islands. A national emblem was also approved at this time.

2009 royal approval
The flag was approved by the General Fono in February 2009 and by Queen Elizabeth II in August. The governor-general presented the new flag to the Ulu as Tokelau's first official flag on 7 September 2009. An official launch of the new flag was planned for October 2009.

See also
 Badge of Tokelau
 Te Atua o Tokelau

References

External links

Tokelau Flag and National Symbol Government of Tokelau
College of Arms December 2009 Newsletter (No. 23) newsletter

Tokelau
Flags of New Zealand
Flag
Southern Cross flags
Flag
Flag
Tokelau